Lorena Zaffalon (born 10 August 1981 in Milan) is an Italian synchronised swimmer. In the 2004 Summer Olympics, held in Athens, Greece, she came seventh in the Women's Team competition and eighth in the Women's Duet competition (alongside Beatrice Spaziani). As part of the Italian team, she won bronze at the 2002 European Aquatics Championships in Berlin and silver at the 2004 European Aquatics Championships in Madrid.

References

Italian synchronized swimmers
Synchronized swimmers at the 2004 Summer Olympics
Olympic synchronized swimmers of Italy
Living people
1981 births
Swimmers from Milan